A taximeter or fare meter is a mechanical or electronic device installed in taxicabs and auto rickshaws that calculates passenger fares based on a combination of distance travelled and waiting time. Its shortened form, "taxi", is also a metonym for the hired cars that use them.

History

The modern taximeter was invented by German Friedrich Wilhelm Gustav Bruhn in 1891, and the Daimler Victoria—the world's first meter-equipped (and gasoline-powered) taxicab—was built by Gottlieb Daimler in 1897.

Taximeters were originally mechanical and mounted outside the cab, above the driver's side front wheel.  Meters were soon relocated inside the taxi, and in the 1980s electronic meters were introduced, doing away with the once-familiar ticking sound of the meter's timing mechanism.

In some locations, taxicabs display a small illuminated sign indicating if they are free (available).  In Argentina, this sign is called a "banderita" (little flag), a carryover term from the days of mechanical taximeters, in which a little flag was turned to wind up the mechanism.  The flag would be hidden at the start of a trip and moved to the visible position at the end.

World Moto developed the world's first portable taximeter for motorcycles and pedicabs, which Fast Company called "the First Real Taxi Meter Innovation in 100 Years".

k constant 
Constant expressed in pulses per kilometre which represents the number of pulses the taximeter must receive in order to correctly indicate a distance traveled of one kilometre.

Functioning 
Taximeters, when they are installed to the taxis, require adjustment of k constant. During the movement, car generates signal which transmitted to the taximeter. Number of signals transmitted per k constant ratio results distance travelled. Within pre-installed tariff values and travel data are multiplied and fare is calculated.

Accessories and features

Taximeters can include several accessories, or act as components in larger dispatching/control systems.  Features include:
 Ticket/receipt printer.
 Fraud control and prevention (on the part of the owner or operator), through the impression of control tickets or computer monitoring. Additionally, taximeters are often visually sealed by a municipal weights and scales authority after initial calibration.
 Radio communication, allowing trip status to be monitored by a dispatcher or supervisor.
 Dispatching of trip assignments through radio or data systems.
 Interaction with GPS systems to assist with dispatching and to provide security.
 Seat sensors that detect the presence of a passenger (to prevent a cab from carrying fares without activating the taximeter).
 Credit or prepaid card support.
 Bluetooth support for communication with smartphones or tablets.
 USB support for setup, diagnostics, and connectivity to the vehicle computer.

Work cycle
During normal operation, taximeters repeat cyclically through several stages:

 Free (or For Hire in the UK): The taxicab is empty and available for hire.  The luminous sign, if present, is switched on.
 Occupied (or Hired): The taximeter enters in this stage at the start of the trip and the "Free" sign is switched off. In this stage the running fare and the present tariff are displayed. Additional information that can be displayed in this mode includes extras (e.g. credits for luggage), present time, speed, etc.
 To Pay (or Stopped in the UK): At the end of the trip, the driver enters this stage to collect payment, make change, and optionally print a receipt. The exterior roof light may also blink to alert potential passengers that the taxi will soon be available.

See also
 Taxicab
 Ohmer fare register
 Mobile data terminal
 Odometer
 Speedometer
 Tachometer

References

External links 
 
 

1891 in Germany
1891 in science
Automotive technologies
German inventions
Measuring instruments
Taxis